The following is a complete list of recordings by the English new wave band A Flock of Seagulls.

Albums

Studio albums

Live albums

Remix albums

Compilation albums

EPs

Singles

Other appearances

Videos

Video albums

Music videos

Notes

References

External links

Discography
Discographies of British artists
Pop music group discographies
Rock music group discographies
New wave discographies